Robert George Cameron Peden (5 April 1906 – 28 December 1985) was a Scottish amateur footballer who made over 100 appearances in the Scottish League for Queen's Park as a goalkeeper. He represented Scotland at amateur level.

Personal life 
Peden worked as a teacher.

References

1906 births
Scottish footballers
Scottish Football League players
Queen's Park F.C. players
Place of death missing
Association football goalkeepers
Scotland amateur international footballers
Sportspeople from St Andrews
Scottish educators

East Fife F.C. players
Dundee F.C. players
1985 deaths
Footballers from Fife